Rüstem is a Turkish spelling of the Persian masculine given name Rostam (Persian: رستم rustam), which is from the name of the Persian mythic hero Rostam. It may refer to:

 Rüstem Pasha (c. 1500–1561), Ottoman grand vizier
 Rüstem Pasha Mosque, Ottoman mosque dedicated to him

See also 
 Rustem (name)
 Rustam (name)
 Rostam (name)

Turkish masculine given names